Clintonville is an unincorporated community in Bourbon County, Kentucky, United States.
Clintonville African American Cemetery Number 1.  There is a Rich history of African American culture that is not noted or documented here.

Geography
Clintonville is located at 38°5′6″N 84°16′7″W (38.085120, -84.268653)

History
The community was named for the local Masonic Lodge, which was named for New York Governor DeWitt Clinton.

Clintonville School opened in September 1925, offering one year of high school in addition to the first eight grades. The original building had four classrooms on the first floor. On the second floor there were two classrooms, a small auditorium, and a stage with dressing rooms behind. The addition of indoor plumbing, the gymnasium, and the first cafeteria were completed in 1936. In 1957 three classrooms, a kitchen, cafeteria, bathroom facilities, and the principal's office were added.

References

Unincorporated communities in Bourbon County, Kentucky
Unincorporated communities in Kentucky